AbsolutelyGospel.com (formerly known as SoGospelNews.com) is the Internet's largest e-zine based on Southern Gospel Music.

History
The site was formed over 19 years ago by Deon & Susan Unthank, then of Southaven, Mississippi. The site was birthed from an email discussion group by the same name. The SoGospelNews email discussion list was created by the Unthanks after the Singing News shut down its extremely popular discussion list.

SoGospelNews started as a simple webpage listing artists, fans, individuals, etc. that were avid supporters of the newly formed SoGospelNews talk list. The site eventually took on printing news for Southern Gospel artists, and eventually took on reviewing the latest recordings from both signed and independent artists within the small genre. SoGospelNews became the most viewed Southern Gospel website on the Internet with over 4,000,000 hits per month.

The Unthank family are now involved in the site, as well as the addition of several staff writers. The website is  based out of Murfreesboro, Tennessee.

In April 2010, SoGospelNews changed its name to AbsolutelyGospel.com. The name change allows them to cover news items of not only Southern Gospel, but also Country Gospel, Inspirational, and Black Gospel. 

On January 5, 2011, Susan Unthank died, leaving the website in control of Deon, their son, Chris, and their daughter Amy.

Content
The site contains Southern Gospel's largest message board forum, bi-weekly feature articles and interviews, bi-weekly album and DVD reviews, opinion columns, editorials, monthly artist articles, devotions, youth articles, a free chat room, staff blogs, and much more in addition to reporting news daily. The website's weekly chart, which is a mixture of fan voting and radio airplay, is the industry's foremost and respected weekly chart.

Shows and events
In addition, every April the site hosts two events: the AGM Music Awards Celebration, and the Absolutely Gospel Music Fan Festival.

The Absolutely Gospel Music Fan Festival is a week-long series of concerts that is sponsored by AbsolutelyGospel.com. The event is held the last week of July and has now expanded to five days of Southern Gospel music. The event remains free to the public and is designed to give Gospel music fans a chance to relax, get to know their favorite artists, and enjoy great Southern Gospel music. The event has featured some of Southern Gospel's most popular artists like the Crabb Family, Talley Trio, Gold City, Karen Peck and New River, The Kingsmen, LordSong, Mike Bowling, Booth Brothers, Dove Brothers Quartet, The Imperials, McRaes, and many more.

AGM Music Awards celebration
The AGM Music Awards were founded in 2002 by the staff of AbsolutelyGospel.com. The award nominations are chosen by the staff of AbsolutelyGospel.com, and most of the winners are then chosen by the fans of the genre and readers of the site. In 2005, AbsolutelyGospel.com held its first AGM Music Awards Celebration which brought in all the artists, industry professionals, and fans for an official awards ceremony. In 2006, AbsolutelyGospel.com held a contest for the readers to name the statue that is presented to the winners at the Awards Celebration, in which "Ovation" was chosen as the winner. The Ovations are handed out on the third Tuesday in April every year.

Southern gospel